Carmen Esme Munroe,  (born 12 November 1932) is a British actress who was born in Berbice, British Guiana (now Guyana), and has been a resident of the UK since the early 1950s. Munroe made her West End stage debut in 1962 and has played an instrumental role in the development of black British theatre and representation on small screen. She has had high-profile roles on stage and television, perhaps best known from the British TV sitcom Desmond's as Shirley, wife of the eponymous barber played by Norman Beaton.

Early life and career
Born Carmen Esme Steele in New Amsterdam, Berbice, British Guiana, where she was educated at Enterprise High School. She emigrated to Britain in 1951, and after studying ophthalmic optics for a year then working as a librarian in Tooting, south London, in 1957 she began studying drama with a group based at the West Indian Students' Centre in Collingham Gardens, south-west London.

Munroe first appeared on the West End stage in 1962 at Wyndham's Theatre in Tennessee Williams’s Period of Adjustment, and had leading roles in later West End productions, such as Alun Owen’s There’ll Be Some Changes Made (1969), Jean Genet’s The Blacks (1970), and as Orinthia in George Bernard Shaw’s The Apple Cart (1970). She also acted in such plays as Lorraine Hansberry's A Raisin in the Sun, Alice Childress's Trouble in Mind and James Baldwin's The Amen Corner. She directed James Saunders' play Alas, Poor Fred for the Umoja Theatre, and also the British premiere of Remembrance, by Derek Walcott at London's Arts Theatre in 1987.

Her work for television has encompassed being for a time a presenter of Play School as well as the BBC's lunchtime children's programme How Do You Do, and a wide variety of acting appearances. These include a part in the 1967 Doctor Who story The Enemy of the World; a part in General Hospital, in The Persuaders (1971), Barry Reckord's In the Beautiful Caribbean (BBC 1972), Alfred Fagon's Shakespeare Country (BBC 1973), The Fosters (LWT, 1976–77), Michael Abbensetts' Black Christmas (BBC, 1977), Mixed Blessings (1978–80), Horace Ové's A Hole in Babylon (BBC, 1979), and Caryl Phillips' The Hope and the Glory (BBC, 1984). Munroe became best known, however, for her regular appearances between 1989 and 1994 in the Channel 4 sitcom Desmond's (written by Trix Worrell) as Shirley, wife of the eponymous barber Desmond Ambrose, played by Norman Beaton.

Her film career included roles in Naked Evil (1966), All Neat in Black Stockings (1968) and The Chain (1984).

She is one of the founders of Talawa, the UK's leading black theatre company, which she established in 1985 together with Mona Hammond, Inigo Espegel and Yvonne Brewster.

In 1992, Munroe "gave an outstanding performance as Essie Robeson in a BBC play called A Song at Twilight".

In 2005/06, Munroe acted in a series of three African American plays at the Tricycle Theatre, Kilburn. The plays were Walk Hard, written by Abram Hill and directed by Nicolas Kent, followed by Gem of the Ocean, written by August Wilson and directed by Paulette Randall, in which Munroe acted in the role of Aunt Esther Tyler, and finally Lynn Nottage's Fabulation, directed by Indhu Rubasingham. In 2007, she acted in  Allister Bain's play Catalysta at the Ovalhouse, directed by Robert Icke, receiving rave reviews for her performance as Eartha. In 2013, Munroe appeared in the CBBC children's comedy/drama show The Dumping Ground (sequel to Tracy Beaker Returns) as Gina's mother Hattie. In 2020, she made a guest appearance on Holby City as a therapist for Jac Naylor (Rosie Marcel)

Awards
Munroe was appointed an Officer of the Order of the British Empire (OBE) in the 2007 Birthday Honours for services to drama.

Further reading
Stephen Bourne, "Carmen Munroe: Standing in the Light" (interview with Brenda Emmanus), in Black in the British Frame: The Black Experience in British Film and Television, Continuum, 2001, pp. 132–141.
Jim Pines (ed.), Black and White in Colour - Black People in British Television Since 1936, London: British Film Institute, 1992.
Carole Woddis, Sheer Bloody Magic – Conversations With Actresses (London: Virago Press, 1991).

References

External links
 

1932 births
Living people
British television actresses
Guyanese emigrants to England
Officers of the Order of the British Empire
Black British actresses
BBC television presenters
People from New Amsterdam, Guyana
Guyanese actresses